Perdita gerhardi is a species of bee in the family Andrenidae. It is found in North America.

Subspecies
These three subspecies belong to the species Perdita gerhardi:
 Perdita gerhardi dallasiana Cockerell, 1906
 Perdita gerhardi gerhardi
 Perdita gerhardi monardae Viereck, 1904

References

Further reading

 
 

Andrenidae
Articles created by Qbugbot
Insects described in 1904